Rothschild Island is a black rugged island  long, mainly ice-covered but surmounted by prominent peaks of Desko Mountains in Antarctica,  west of the north part of Alexander Island in the north entrance to Wilkins Sound.

History
The island was sighted from a distance by the French Antarctic Expedition (c. 1908-1910), and named by Jean-Baptiste Charcot in honor of Édouard Alphonse James de Rothschild (1868-1949), head of the Rothschild banking family of France and president of de Rothschild Frères.

In the subsequent explorations of the area by the British Graham Land Expedition (BGLE) (c. 1934-1937), the feature was believed to be a mountain connected to Alexander Island. Geologically this might be true—but it has not been proven by any means due to a lack of anything like a complete geological survey of the region.

However, Rothschild Island's insularity was reaffirmed by the United States Antarctic Service (USAS, c. 1939-1941) who photographed and roughly mapped the island from the air.

Modern exploration
Rothschild Island was mapped in detail from air photos taken by the Ronne Antarctic Research Expedition (RARE c1947-1948) and by Searle of the Falkland Islands Dependencies Survey (FIDS) in 1960, and from US governmental satellite imagery taken in 1974.

Threats and preservation
Although this very remote part of the world has never been inhabited and is protected by the Antarctic Treaty System, which bans industrial development, waste disposal, and nuclear testing, there is still a threat to these fragile ecosystems from increasing tourism, primarily on cruises across the Southern Ocean from the port of Ushuaia, Argentina.

See also

 Larsen Ice Shelf
 Composite Antarctic Gazetteer
 List of Antarctic and sub-Antarctic islands
 List of Antarctic islands south of 60° S
 SCAR
 Territorial claims in Antarctica
 List of Antarctic ice shelves
 Wilkins Sound

References

Further reading
 Defense Mapping Agency  1992, Sailing Directions (planning Guide) and (enroute) for Antarctica, P 379

External links
 Rothschild Island on USGS website
 Rothschild Island on SCAR website

Islands of Palmer Land
Island